Piravash-e Sofla (also Romanized as Pīrāvash-e Soflá; also known as Pīrāvash, Pīrāvash-e Jorjānīyeh, Pīrāvash-e Pā’īn, and Pīrāvosh) is a village in Aq Altin Rural District, in the Central District of Aqqala County, Golestan Province, Iran. At the 2006 census, its population was 4,692, in 1,012 families.

References 

Populated places in Aqqala County